Archithosia similis is a moth of the subfamily Arctiinae. It was described by Sven Jorgen R. Birket-Smith in 1965. It is found in Cameroon.

References

Endemic fauna of Cameroon
Moths described in 1965
Lithosiini
Insects of Cameroon
Moths of Africa